The Oberheim OB-1 was a monophonic, programmable, analog synthesizer introduced by Oberheim Electronics in 1978. It originally sold for $1,895 and was the first analog synthesizer capable of storing patches. The design was a replacement for the previous generation of Oberheim SEM (Synthesizer Expansion Module) based instruments and intended to be used for live performance.

Specification

The OB-1 is monophonic version of the Oberheim OB-X, with two VCOs and a Low Pass filter. It also contained an envelope control for both the filter and amplitude.

In popular culture

Notable users of the OB-1 were the composer and musician Vince Clarke and the bands Tangerine Dream, Rush, and The Grid. A 2014 feature on the French radio station France Inter claimed that the OB-1 had been used by the Star Wars sound engineer Ben Burtt to create the voice of R2-D2 and that the name of another Star Wars character, Obi-Wan Kenobi, derives from a transliteration of "OB-1". However, Star Wars was first released in 1977, a year before the OB-1, and most sources credit the ARP 2600 synthesizer as being used to record R2-D2's voice.

References

OB-1
Analog synthesizers
Monophonic synthesizers